Thomas Alexander Wunderlich (born 1 May 1955 in Vienna) is a Professor of Geodesy at the Technical University of Munich.

References

1955 births
Living people
Academic staff of the Technical University of Munich
Scientists from Vienna
Austrian geodesists
21st-century Austrian people